Decoy receptor 3 (Dcr3), also known as tumor necrosis factor receptor superfamily member 6B (TNFRSF6B), TR6 and M68, is a soluble protein of the tumor necrosis factor receptor superfamily which inhibits Fas ligand-induced apoptosis.

Discovery 
Dcr3 was identified in 1998 by the search of genes with homology to the TNFR gene superfamily in expressed sequence tag (EST) database.

Structure
The open reading frame of TNFRSF6B encodes 300 amino acids with a 29-residue signal sequence and four tandem cystein-rich repeats. Two transcript variants encoding the same isoform, but differing in the 5' UTR, have been observed for this gene. Unlike most of the other members of TNFR superfamily, TNFRSF6 is a soluble protein which contains no transmembrane domain.

Function 

This gene belongs to the tumor necrosis factor receptor superfamily. It acts as a decoy receptor that competes with death receptors for ligand binding. The encoded protein is postulated to play a regulatory role in suppressing FasL- and LIGHT-mediated cell death and T cell activation as well as to induce angiogenesis via neutralization of TL1A. Overexpression of this gene has been noted in various tumors e.g. gastrointestinal tract tumors, and it is located in a gene-rich cluster on chromosome 20, with other potentially tumor-related genes.

Interactions
TNFRSF6B has been shown to interact with:
 TNFSF14
 Fas ligand.

References

Further reading

External links
   GeneReviews/NCBI/NIH/UW entry on Autoimmune Lymphoproliferative Syndrome